Albert Taylor (Belleville, 20 May 1911 – Hamilton, 9 September 1988) was a Canadian rower who competed in the 1932 Summer Olympics.

In 1932 he was a crew member of the Canadian boat which won the bronze medal in the eights event.

At the 1930 Empire Games he won the bronze medal with the Canadian boat in the eights competition.

References

External links
 
 

1911 births
1988 deaths
Canadian male rowers
Olympic rowers of Canada
Rowers at the 1932 Summer Olympics
Olympic bronze medalists for Canada
Rowers at the 1930 British Empire Games
Commonwealth Games bronze medallists for Canada
Olympic medalists in rowing
Medalists at the 1932 Summer Olympics
Commonwealth Games medallists in rowing
Medallists at the 1930 British Empire Games